Gidansda Giindajin Haawasti Guujaaw, also known as Gary Edenshaw,  is a singer, wood carver, traditional medicine practitioner, political activist and leader. He of Gakyaals Kiiqawaay, a Haida family of the Raven moiety. He has currently inherited the name Gidansda from his potlatch in 2017, the title of Gakyaals Kiiqawaay hereditary leader. The family's alternate name, "Skedans", is an anglicized mispronunciation of the family's hereditary leader's title.

Biography
He was born in Masset, named  in Haida, on the northern part of Haida Gwaii. His father, is matrilineally descended from the Eagle moiety from the Yakoun River.

 means drum, a name formally given him at a potlatch at Kiusta.

 began going out onto the land at a young age, digging cockles, picking seaweed with his mother, hunting and fishing with his father and trapping with his uncle. In his infancy he spent summers with his great-grandmother who lived to be 114 years old. She was a singer who taped over 100 songs and became the greatest influence on his life.

Elders also played an important role in 's growth and understanding of the world. It was through this engagement with their wisdom and the old ways that  undertook journeys around the Islands by row-boat and canoes, often alone. He knows the ways of the Islands as well as anyone.

 has worked with the Council of the Haida Nation for the past twenty years to secure the protection of some areas of the Islands as well as pushing for more care and sustainable use of Island resources. Today, he is a member of the Archipelago Management Board which co-manages, with the Government of Canada, .

He has been involved in developing the policies and strategies of the Council of the Haida Nation, and has served as the negotiator for the Council of the Haida Nation and worked to develop guidelines and policies towards the protection of living Haida archaeological sites (culturally modified trees). He has held the official position of 'Firekeeper' for the Hereditary Chiefs of Haida Gwaii.

 has been a regular contributor to  — the official publication of the Council of the Haida Nation. He is a dedicated teacher working to pass songs and dances on to the next generation within the broader context of Haida culture. His love for the land and understanding of the vulnerability of life has put him in the position of devoting much of his adulthood to fighting the forces that are changing the land.

Today  continues to balance carving with his many other roles which include; political activist, teacher, medicinal practitioner, historian, and performer.

His son Gwaai Edenshaw is an artist and film director, most noted as co-director of the first-ever Haida-language feature-length film Edge of the Knife.

References

Bibliography and further reading
 Skidegate Text and Histories  by Swanton ...Enrico (with a foreword by Guujaaw)
 Haida Gwaii by Fedje and Mathews (with a foreword by Guujaaw)
 Mycelium Running  by Paul Stamats (Guujaaw note)
 Raven Travelling (Guujaaw quote and art)
Neel, David. The Great Canoes: Reviving a Northwest Coast Tradition. Douglas & McIntyre. 1995. 
The Golden Spruce: A True Story of Myth, Madness, and Greed, By John Vaillant.  W. W. Norton & Co. 2005.
David Suzuki: The Autobiography, David Suzuki. Greystone Books.  2006.
All That We Say Is Ours: Guujaaw and the Reawakening of the Haida Nation, Ian Gill. 2009. (Shortlisted for BC Book Prize and nominated for the Roderick Haig-Brown Regional Book Prize)

External links
 http://guujaaw.info
 http://www.haidanation.ca/Pages/CHN/Guujaaw_Pop-Up.html
 http://archive.ecotrust.org/news/news_archive/guujaaw-wins-award_20060719.html

1953 births
Living people
20th-century Canadian artists
20th-century First Nations people
21st-century Canadian artists
21st-century First Nations people
Haida woodcarvers
Indigenous leaders in British Columbia